Niphates digitalis, commonly known as the pink vase sponge,  is a species of sea sponge belonging to the family Niphatidae. It is native to the Florida Keys, The Bahamas, and the Caribbean including the Netherlands Antilles. The species was first described by Jean-Baptiste Lamarck in 1814.

Characteristics
The pink vase sponge is a demosponge that can grow up to 50 cm in height and width, but is more commonly smaller. It is normally vase-, tube-, or cup-shaped with a narrow base and broader top, and somewhat flattened when viewed in cross section. Rarely, it can grow as a fan shape.  Despite its name, the colour has been observed as blue, gray, and lavender, as well as "purplish to pink". The surface is coarse and porous with 6-mm-long conules or spines.

Chemistry

Compounds extracted from the pink vase sponge have been investigated for their possible use in the treatment of castration recurrent prostate cancer. A common reagent used in organic chemistry 1,8-diazabicycloundec-7-ene can be isolated from this sponge.

References

Haplosclerida
Animals described in 1814
Taxa named by Jean-Baptiste Lamarck